In the mathematical discipline of set theory, 0# (zero sharp, also 0#) is the set of true formulae about indiscernibles and order-indiscernibles in the Gödel constructible universe. It is often encoded as a subset of the integers (using Gödel numbering), or as a subset of the hereditarily finite sets, or as a real number. Its existence is unprovable in ZFC, the standard form of axiomatic set theory, but follows from a suitable large cardinal axiom.

Roughly speaking, if 0# exists then the universe V of sets is much larger than the universe L of constructible sets, while if it does not exist then the universe of all sets is closely approximated by the constructible sets.

Definition 

Zero sharp was defined by Silver and Solovay as follows. Consider the language of set theory with extra constant symbols c1, c2, ... for each positive integer. Then 0# is defined to be the set of Gödel numbers of the true sentences about the constructible universe, with ci interpreted as the uncountable cardinal ℵi.
(Here ℵi means ℵi in the full universe, not the constructible universe.)

If there is in V an uncountable set of Silver order-indiscernibles in the constructible universe L, then 0# is the set of Gödel numbers of formulas θ of set theory such that

where ω1, ... ωω are the "small" uncountable initial ordinals in V, but have all large cardinal properties consistent with V=L relative to L.

There is a subtlety about this definition: by Tarski's undefinability theorem it is not, in general, possible to define the truth of a formula of set theory in the language of set theory. To solve this, Silver and Solovay assumed the existence of a suitable large cardinal, such as a Ramsey cardinal, and showed that with this extra assumption it is possible to define the truth of statements about the constructible universe. More generally, the definition of 0# works provided that there is an uncountable set of indiscernibles for some Lα, and the phrase "0# exists" is used as a shorthand way of saying this.

There are several minor variations of the definition of 0#, which make no significant difference to its properties. There are many different choices of Gödel numbering, and 0# depends on this choice. Instead of being considered as a subset of the natural numbers, it is also possible to encode 0# as a subset of formulae of a language, or as a subset of the hereditarily finite sets, or as a real number.

Statements implying existence

The condition about the existence of a Ramsey cardinal implying that 0# exists can be weakened.  The existence of ω1-Erdős cardinals implies the existence of 0#. This is close to being best possible, because the existence of 0# implies that in the constructible universe there is an α-Erdős cardinal for all countable α, so such cardinals cannot be used to prove the existence of 0#.

Chang's conjecture implies the existence of 0#.

Statements equivalent to existence
Kunen showed that 0# exists if and only if there exists a non-trivial elementary embedding for the Gödel constructible universe L into itself.

Donald A. Martin and Leo Harrington have shown that the existence of 0# is equivalent to the determinacy of lightface analytic games.  In fact, the strategy for a universal lightface analytic game has the same Turing degree as 0#.

It follows from Jensen's covering theorem that the existence of 0# is equivalent to ωω being a regular cardinal in the constructible universe L.

Silver showed that the existence of an uncountable set of indiscernibles in the constructible universe is equivalent to the existence of 0#.

Consequences of existence and non-existence 
Its existence implies that every uncountable cardinal in the set-theoretic universe V is an indiscernible in L and satisfies all large cardinal axioms that are realized in L (such as being totally ineffable).  It follows that the existence of 0# contradicts the axiom of constructibility: V = L.

If 0# exists, then it is an example of a non-constructible Δ set of integers. This is in some sense the simplest possibility for a non-constructible set, since all Σ and Π sets of integers are constructible.

On the other hand, if 0# does not exist, then the constructible universe L is the core model—that is, the canonical inner model that approximates the large cardinal structure of the universe considered. In that case, Jensen's covering lemma holds:

For every uncountable set x of ordinals there is a constructible y such that x ⊂ y and y has the same cardinality as x.

This deep result is due to Ronald Jensen. Using forcing it is easy to see that the condition that x is uncountable cannot be removed. For example, consider Namba forcing, that preserves  and collapses  to an ordinal of cofinality .

Other sharps 
If x is any set, then x# is defined analogously to 0# except that one uses L[x] instead of L.  See the section on relative constructibility in constructible universe.

See also 
 0†, a set similar to 0# where the constructible universe is replaced by a larger inner model with a measurable cardinal.

References 
 

 
 

Real numbers
Determinacy
Large cardinals
Constructible universe